Peter Schousboe   (1766–1832) was a Danish botanist.

Biography
Peder Kofod Anker Schousboe was born in Rønne, Denmark and died  in Tangier, Morocco, having served as Danish consul general in Tangier from 1800 onwards.  He conducted a botanical expedition in Spain and Morocco during the years 1791-93. In 1800, he published his major work Om Væxtriget i Marokko. Among the plants that he was the first to describe was the popular garden flower Salvia interrupta; the bushwillow genus Schousboea (now considered a synonym of Combretum) was named in his honour.

References

External links
Biographical information about Schousboe on the website of the Herbarium of the University of Göttingen

1766 births
1832 deaths
People from Bornholm
19th-century Danish botanists
Knights of the Order of the Dannebrog
18th-century Danish botanists